"Anger Rising" is a song by American rock musician Jerry Cantrell. It was the lead single from his 2002 solo album, Degradation Trip. Cantrell's fourth single overall, the track made its radio debut in early April 2002. The single spent 18 weeks on Billboard's Mainstream Rock Tracks chart and peaked at No. 10.

"Anger Rising" begins with a choir-like, non-lexical vocal harmony over acoustic guitar. This leads into heavy guitars with a steady beat and an aggressive, snarling chorus. Described by MTV's Joe D'Angelo as "a dysfunctional family portrait with a violent hue that revisits themes found in the Alice in Chains hit "Rooster", the song deals with domestic abuse and evokes imagery of life in a decrepit trailer park.

Chris DeGarmo, formerly of Queensrÿche, makes a guest appearance playing slide guitar on "Anger Rising". DeGarmo had previously performed on tour with Cantrell in promotion of his 1998 album, Boggy Depot. He also recorded music with Mike Inez and Sean Kinney, bandmates of Cantrell, in Spys4Darwin.

Release
"Anger Rising" made its radio debut in early April 2002, spent 18 weeks on Billboard's Mainstream Rock Tracks chart and peaked at No. 10 on June 29, 2002.

The single was made available for free download via Roadrunner Records' official website on May 6, 2002.

Music video
A music video directed by Paul R. Brown was made to accompany the single. It found considerable circulation on MTV2 and Much Music, and can be viewed on Degradation Trip Volumes 1 & 2.

Chart positions

Track listing

Personnel
 Jerry Cantrell – vocals, lead guitar
 Chris DeGarmo – slide guitar 
 Robert Trujillo – bass guitar
 Mike Bordin – drums

References

External links
"Anger Rising" official music video on YouTube

2002 singles
Jerry Cantrell songs
Songs written by Jerry Cantrell
2000 songs
Roadrunner Records singles